Sure as Fate is a 60-minute American anthology mystery drama series that aired on CBS from 1950–51.  It was produced live and was narrated by Paul Lukas.  Its guest stars included Robert Cummings, E.G. Marshall, Kim Stanley, John Carradine, Douglas Fairbanks, Jr., Leslie Nielsen, and Marsha Hunt. 

Jerry Danzig was the producer.  Among its directors were Yul Brynner and Hal Gerson. The series originated at WCBS-TV in New York City. The program was sustaining.

The November 14, 1950, episode was "Ten Days to Spring", starring Elspeth Eric and Ted Newton.

References

External links

List of episodes at CTVA

1950 American television series debuts
1951 American television series endings
1950s American anthology television series
CBS original programming
American live television series